John Denman Cooper (25 February 1889 — 1952) was a footballer who played for Barnsley and Newport County. He was a goalkeeper.

Club career
Cooper was a member of the Barnsley side who won the FA Cup in 1912 beating West Bromwich Albion in the replay after the first match ended goalless. He fumbled a save in the first fifteen minutes of the first match and was saved from embarrassment by a lack of WBA forwards. In the replay he made an important save, diving onto his side, to save a quick shot from Bob Pailor, the WBA centre forward, though the ball was finally cleared by Bob Glendinning.

In 1920, Cooper signed for Newport County. On 16 October 1920, Cooper was punched to the ground after confronting Millwall supporters throwing missiles at him. The Old Den was closed for two weeks as a result.

Honours
Barnsley
FA Cup: Winners 1912

References

1880s births
1952 deaths
People from Sneinton
Footballers from Nottinghamshire
English footballers
Association football goalkeepers
English Football League players
Barnsley F.C. players
Newport County A.F.C. players
Sutton Town A.F.C. players
FA Cup Final players